Trifolium ambiguum, the kura clover or Caucasian clover, is a species of flowering plant in the family Fabaceae. It is native to Ukraine, Crimea, south European Russia, the northern Caucasus, Turkey, Iraq, and Iran, and has been introduced to New South Wales. Planted for forage, once established it is tolerant of close grazing, and is also useful for honey production.

References

ambiguum
Forages
Flora of the Crimean Peninsula
Flora of Ukraine
Flora of South European Russia
Flora of the North Caucasus
Flora of Turkey
Flora of Iraq
Flora of Iran
Plants described in 1808